Paola Valentina Galue Greco (born 21 October 1992), also known as Paola Galue, is a Venezuelan actress, model and singer. She is known for her roles as Paola in the Boomerang Latin America original series, Somos tú y yo.

Life and career 
Galue was born in Valencia, Venezuela, where she spent her first years of life, until her adolescence, which was established in Madrid.

In 2008, Galue participated in the open audition for the second season of the original Boomerang and Venevision series, Somos tú y yo. After a series of tests by the producers of the series, Galué is finally selected as part of the project, where she plays the character of Paola. The series was a co-production between the Boomerang and Venevisión, the series was broadcast in Latin America, Europe, Middle East and Asia. The series was premiered for the first time on June 27, 2007 in Venezuela by Venevisión. The series premiered on January 15, 2008 by Boomerang in Latin America and Europe. The series ended on December 15, 2008 and its final episode had and audience of approximately 9.8 million. In 2008, the cast toured Venezuela, performing songs from the series, and when the show ended in 2009, a compilation album of ten songs from the series, titled Somos tú y yo: un nuevo día was released.

In 2009, Galue confirmed that he would not participate in Somos tú y yo, un nuevo día, spin-off of Somos tú y yo. After completing the filming of Somos tú y yo, Galué settled down in Spain to continue her studies and continue her career as an actress.

In 2012, Galue resumed her career as a singer and joined the musical band Vicious Circle on tour in Morocco.

Filmography

Tours
Somos tú y yo (2007)

References

External links 
 
 
 

1992 births
21st-century Venezuelan actresses
Venezuelan female models
21st-century Venezuelan women singers
Living people